is a Japanese professional baseball catcher for the Orix Buffaloes in Japan's Nippon Professional Baseball.

He married anime voice actress Rika Tachibana on December 28, 2019.

References

External links

NPB stats

1995 births
Living people
Baseball people from Saitama Prefecture
Nippon Professional Baseball catchers
Japanese baseball players
Orix Buffaloes players